Dungog railway station is located on the North Coast line in New South Wales, Australia. It serves the town of Dungog opening on 14 August 1911. Originally built with only one face, in 1944 the platform was converted to an island platform and the present station building constructed.

Platforms & services
Dungog has an island platform with two faces. It also has a passing loop to the east of the station. It is the terminating point for NSW TrainLink's Hunter line services from Newcastle and a stopping point for NSW TrainLink XPT services. There are five local services to/from Newcastle on weekdays, with three per day on weekends and public holidays. Each day northbound XPT services operate to Grafton, Casino and Brisbane, with three southbound services operating to Sydney. This station is a request stop for the southbound Casino XPT, so this service stops here only if passengers booked to board/alight here.

Gallery

References

External links

Dungog station details Transport for New South Wales

Easy Access railway stations in New South Wales
Railway stations in the Hunter Region
Railway stations in Australia opened in 1911
Regional railway stations in New South Wales
North Coast railway line, New South Wales